Hippopsis ocularis is a species of beetle in the family Cerambycidae. It was described by Galileo and Martins in 1995.

References

Hippopsis
Beetles described in 1995